This is a summary of the electoral history of Walter Nash, Prime Minister of New Zealand (1957–60), Leader of the Labour Party (1951–63) and Member of Parliament for Hutt (1929–68).

Parliamentary elections

1925 election

1928 election

1929 by-election

1931 election

 
 
 
 

 

Table footnotes:

1935 election

1938 election

1943 election

1946 election

1949 election

1951 election

1954 election

1957 election

1960 election

1963 election

1966 election

Local elections

1929 local elections

1933 local elections

1935 local elections

Leadership elections

1940 Deputy-leadership election

1951 Leadership election

1954 Leadership election

Notes

References

Nash, Walter